The Association of Science and Technology Centers (ASTC) is a non-profit, global organization based in Washington, D.C., in the United States, that provides professional support for science centers, museums, and related institutions. ASTC's goal is to increase awareness of the contributions its members make to their communities and the field of informal STEM learning.

Founded in 1973, ASTC now represents nearly 700 members in almost 50 countries, including not only science centers and museums, but also nature centers, aquariums, planetariums, zoos, botanical gardens, and natural history and children's museums, as well as companies, consultants, and other organizations that share an interest in informal science education.

Member programs

Passport Program
ASTC member institutions can participate in ASTC's Passport Program, allowing members of participating institutions to visit other participating institutions for free, provided the member is visiting an institution more than 90 miles from their home institution. More than 300 institutions in over a dozen countries are currently participating in the Passport Program.

Annual Conference
Each year, nearly 2,000 individuals representing science centers and museums from across the world, informal science educators, and companies collaborating with the museum field gather for ASTC's Annual Conference.

Professional development
ASTC provides professional development opportunities for those who work in science centers and other institutions of informal learning. ASTC's professional development services include Communities of Practice (CoP), which provides informal science education professionals with resources and support for connecting with colleagues, convening meetings, and organizing workshops, among other activities.

ExhibitFiles
ExhibitFiles is an online community of exhibit practitioners building a shared collection of exhibition records and reviews. Community members can connect with colleagues, find out about exhibits, and share their experiences. ExhibitFiles was developed to preserve and share experiences and materials that are often unrecorded, temporary, and hard to locate. Visitors to the site can also search for, and post exhibitions rentals and sales.

Dimensions
ASTC publishes Dimensions, which features in-depth analysis of news and trends in the science center and museum field, in addition to articles about noteworthy events and resources. Dimensions readers include directors and staff of ASTC-member institutions around the world, as well as those with an interest in informal science education. Until 2020, Dimensions was a bimonthly print and online magazine; since mid-2020, it is an exclusively online publication that publishes continuously.

Center for Advancement of Informal Science Education
ASTC is home to the Center for Advancement of Informal Science Education (CAISE). CAISE's supports the informal science education (ISE) community by creating and disseminating resources, as well as catalyzing conversation and collaboration across the ISE field—including film and broadcast media, science centers and museums, zoos and aquariums, botanical gardens and nature centers, digital media and gaming, science journalism, and youth, community, and after-school programs. Founded in 2007 with support from the National Science Foundation (NSF) Advancing Informal STEM Learning (AISL) program, CAISE is a partnership among ASTC and Co-Principal Investigators at Oregon State University (OSU), the University of Pittsburgh Center for Learning in Out-of-School Environments (UPCLOSE), The Great Lakes Science Center and KQED San Francisco. CAISE manages the InformalScience.org website, which is a repository of project descriptions, evaluation reports and tools, and research papers and products that are collected and curated to provide informal STEM Learning practitioners with knowledge that can be used when developing new work and seeking potential collaborators.

References

External links
Official website

Science centers
Science museums
Technology museums
Organizations established in 1973
1973 establishments in Washington, D.C.
International scientific organizations
Science and technology in the United States
Museum associations and consortia
Members of the International Science Council
Non-profit organizations based in Washington, D.C.
501(c)(3) organizations